The ABC Motsepe League, previously known as the Vodacom League between 1998 and 2012, was founded in 1998 as the current Second Division and the overall third tier of South African football. The competition is regulated by SAFA, and until 2012 had been sponsored by mobile telecommunications company Vodacom.

It features 144 teams in total, divided into 9 divisions, borders decided by the 9 geo-political provinces of South Africa: Eastern Cape, Free State, KwaZulu Natal, Northern Cape, Western Cape, Gauteng, Limpopo, Mpumalanga and North West. Each provincial division contains 16 teams. The winner of each provincial division qualifies for the annual promotional playoffs, where the winners of two streams are promoted to the National First Division. In each province, the two lowest-ranked teams by the end of the season, are relegated to the fourth tier U21 SAB Regional League, which in return will promote two playoff winners from the Regional Championships.

All clubs in South Africa also are allowed to compete with youth teams (U19/U21) and/or a reserve team in a lower SAFA league. If a club opt to field such teams, the U19 teams will start out at the fifth level in the U19 National League, while U21 teams or reserve teams will start out at the fourth level in the U21 SAB Regional League. If any U19 team win promotion for U21 SAB Regional League or SAFA Second Division, this promotion is fully accepted. No club are entitled to field two teams at the same level, and rule 4.6.4 of the SAFA regulations states that if the mother club play in the National First Division or Premier Soccer League, then the highest level these additional Youth/Reserve teams are allowed to compete will be the SAFA Second Division. In such cases, where a non-promotable team manage to win their regional division, the ticket for the promotional playoffs will instead be handed over to the second-best team in the division.

In March 2014, the Motsepe Foundation signed a five-year deal for the naming rights of the competition worth 40 million ZAR. Patrice Motsepe named the competition in honour of his late father, Augustine Butana Chaane Motsepe.

Provincial divisions

The 9 geographical provinces of South Africa, each have a local division in the SAFA Second Division. These divisions belong either to the Inland Stream or Coastal Stream, which are used to place the provincial winners into two round robin groups, at the promotional playoff stage by the end of the season. The Coastal Stream comprises: Eastern Cape, Free State, KwaZulu-Natal, Northern Cape, Western Cape; while the Inland Stream comprises: Gauteng, Limpopo, Mpumalanga and North West. In previous years, until August 2008, the Free State province belonged to the Inland Stream.

Provincial winners

Coastal Stream

Eastern Cape

Kwazulu Natal

Northern Cape

Western Cape

Coastal Stream / Inland Stream
Free State belonged to the Inland Stream from 1998 to 2008, but was transferred to the Coastal Stream for subsequent seasons.

Free State

Inland Stream

Gauteng

Limpopo

Mpumalanga

North West

Promoted teams
In the seasons from 1998 to 2003, the four best teams from the Vodacom League—determined by annual playoffs among the winners and runners-up of the 9 provinces in South Africa—won promotion for the National First Division. The playoff system divided the teams into an Inland Stream and Coastal Stream, where the best two teams from each stream won promotion.

In the seasons after 2003, the number of annually promoted teams decreased to 2. The concept of the playoff system, however, remained the same, in regards of dividing the teams into a Coastal Stream and Inland Stream, but now of course only to reward the winner of both streams with promotion. Both promoted teams will then finally also meet to play the overall final, where the overall league championship trophy is at stake.

The list below show all the promoted teams, since 1998.

References

External links
South Africa Football Association: Database with logs and results

 
3
South
Professional sports leagues in South Africa